This is a list of flags which are entirely or largely black.

In history

 The Black Banner or Black Standard used by Abu Muslim in his uprising leading to the Abbasid Revolution in 747.
 During the German Peasants' War in the 16th century, the white, black and pink flag was used by the revolting farmers.
Afghanistan flew a solid black flag from 1709 to 1738 and from 1880 to 1901 (see Flag of Afghanistan).
 The black flag with the motto Viurem lliures o morirem (We live free or we will die) was flown by  Catalan army and militia corps during the final stages of the War of the Spanish Succession, when the Allies had already abandoned Catalonia that fought alone against the Spanish and French armies during 1713–1714. This black flag was packaged in 2012 with the historical novel  Lliures o Morts (Free or Dead) authored by Jaume Clotet and David de Montserrat.
 The Anarchist black flag has been an anarchist symbol since the 1880s. Anarchists use either a plain black flag or a black flag with an "A" and an "O" around it, this symbol is a reference to a Proudhon quote "Anarchy is Order Without Power". Since the Spanish Revolution of 1936, the diagonal red-and-black flag became more widely used.
 The color black was famous as the flag of Italy's National Fascist Party, designed after the party's paramilitary Blackshirts.
 Schutzstaffel used black flag with double sig runes.
 Upon the surrender of Nazi Germany in World War II German U-boats were ordered to fly a black flag and sail to an Allied port and surrender.

 The Jolly Roger, or skull and crossbones, is flown to identify a ship's crew as pirates about to attack. The flag most commonly identified as the Jolly Roger today is the skull and crossbones (although swords are also common), a flag consisting of a human skull above two long bones (probably tibias) set in an x-mark arrangement, most usually depicted crossing each other directly under the skull, on a black field. This design was used by several pirates, including Captains "Black Sam" Bellamy, Edward England, and John Taylor. Some Jolly Roger flags also include an hourglass, another common symbol representing death in 17th- and 18th-century Europe. Despite the prominence of flags with art in popular culture, plain black flags with no art were often employed by most pirates in the 17th–18th century. Historically, the flag was flown to frighten the pirates' victims into surrendering without a fight, since it conveyed the message that the attackers were outlaws who would not consider themselves bound by the usual rules of engagement—and might, therefore, slaughter those they defeated (since captured pirates were usually hanged, they did not have much to gain by asking quarter if defeated). Since the decline of piracy, various military units have used the Jolly Roger, usually in skull-and-crossbones design, as a unit identification insignia or a victory flag to ascribe to themselves the proverbial ferocity and toughness of pirates. In a non-naval context the skull and crossbones motif has additional meanings, for example, to signify a hazard such as poison.
 The Ahmadiyya flag, first designed in the 1930s during the second Caliphate. Just as the black colour absorbs visible light, similarly the black colour symbolizes the absorption of spiritual light.
 The flag of the Chetnik movement in Serbia and former Yugoslavia during the 20th century, with the words "Sloboda ili smrt ('liberty or death') inscribed in white under a skull.
 The flags of the Makhnovshchina and Kholodnyi Yar Republic during the Ukrainian War of Independence (1917-1921).

Jihadism in the 20th/21st century

In Ali Soufan's book The Black Banners, he explains the title by noting that quotes from various Hadiths regarding "Black Banners" of a "new army" taking over Khorasan have some kind of prophetic significance with many modern adherents of extremist jihadism. He notes that it is "not a coincidence" that Osama bin Laden made al-Qaeda's flag black. Soufan also notes that there is debate about whether the prophet Mohammed actually spoke some of the quoted Hadiths (such as one attributed to Abu Hurairah). He also notes that Sheikh Salman al-Ouda has said the Black Banner hadiths are not able to be authenticated.

In society

 Black flags are often associated with funerals in the West, particularly state funerals and public mourning. In the former Yugoslavia, a plain black flag is the flag of mourning. It is displayed for 40 days after death on the deceased person's house.
 The black flag is the symbol of the Jewish ultra-Orthodox, anti-Zionist group, Neturei Karta. It is flown as a sign of mourning over the creation of the State of Israel, most commonly on Israeli Independence Day.
 The Swedish Pirate Party has a black flag as a symbol, shaped like the letter P.
 In the German and Finnish militaries, black has been the traditional color of armored troops, which carries over to the flags of armored units. In Finland, also combat engineers have a black flag. The Armoured Brigade has a black flag defaced with a helmet, and engineer battalions have the black flags defaced with various symbols.
 The New Zealand Rugby Union team, commonly known as the All Blacks, have a predominantly black flag with a white fern superimposed: see List of New Zealand flags.
 The flag of Cornwall is mostly black with a white cross on it.

As a signal in competitions and sports
The black flag is a racing flag used to signal a driver's disqualification. In sail racing, when the black flag is displayed with the preparatory signal, a boat that is over the starting line in the minute before the starting signal is immediately disqualified without a hearing. In some forms of racing,  a black flag is used to disqualify competitors or indicate some other penalty (such as a forced pit stop in NASCAR).

Fictional black flags
In The Silmarillion and other Middle-earth writings of J.R.R. Tolkien, the banner of the evil overlord Morgoth is described as being entirely black with no insignia.

See also 
Red flag (politics)
Yellow flag
Green flag
Blue flag (disambiguation)
Bonnie Blue Flag
White flag

References

Black flags
Black
Flags, black, list of

ja:黒旗